Tang Chenar Rural District is in the Central District of Mehriz County, Yazd province, Iran. At the National Census of 2006, its population was 1,580 in 479 households. There were 1,499 inhabitants in 509 households at the following census of 2011. At the most recent census of 2016, the population of the rural district was 1,599 in 572 households. The largest of its 94 villages was Amirabad, with 289 people in 98 households.

References 

Mehriz County

Rural Districts of Yazd Province

Populated places in Yazd Province

Populated places in Mehriz County